Potamonautes lirrangensis, the Malawi blue crab, is a species of freshwater crab in the family Potamonautidae. This common and widespread species is found in Lake Malawi, Lake Kivu, the upper Congo River Basin and Malagarasi River in the Democratic Republic of the Congo, Malawi, Rwanda, and Tanzania. In the freshwater aquarium trade it is sometimes sold under the synonym Potamonautes orbitospinus.

References

Potamoidea
Crustaceans described in 1904
Taxa named by Mary J. Rathbun
Freshwater crustaceans of Africa
Arthropods of the Democratic Republic of the Congo
Arthropods of Malawi
Arthropods of Rwanda
Arthropods of Tanzania
Taxonomy articles created by Polbot